Hatun Q'asa (Quechua hatun big (jatun in Bolivia), q'asa mountain pass, "big mountain pass", hispanicized spelling Jatun Casa) is a mountain in the Wansu mountain range in the Andes of Peru, about  high. It is situated in the Arequipa Region, Condesuyos Province, Cayarani District. Hatun Q'asa lies at the Q'illumayu valley (Quechua for "yellow river", also spelled Quellomayo).

References 

Mountains of Peru
Mountains of Arequipa Region